Pierre Achille Webó Kouamo (born 20 January 1982), known as Pierre Webó, is a Cameroonian football manager and former professional player who played as a striker. He is the assistant manager of Turkish club İstanbul Başakşehir.

He spent eight years of his career in La Liga, appearing in a combined 227 matches for Osasuna and Mallorca and scoring 47 goals (in Spain he also represented Leganés). He also competed professionally in Uruguay and Turkey.

A Cameroon international in the 2000s, Webó appeared with the country in two World Cups and as many Africa Cup of Nations.

Playing career

Club

Early years
Born in Bafoussam, West Region, Webó started his professional career in Uruguay, playing three years with Club Nacional de Football, winning two Primera División titles – although he only was an important first-team member in his third year – and becoming top scorer of the 2002 edition of the South American Cup.

He moved to Europe in January 2003, signing with second division club CD Leganés, on the outskirts of Madrid, on loan from CA Osasuna.

Osasuna
In the summer of 2003, Webó returned to Osasuna, for whom he scored six goals in his third season, being instrumental in the Navarrese side's fourth La Liga place and UEFA Champions League qualification, although they would ultimately be ousted by Hamburger SV prior to the group stage.

His 2006–07 pre-season was hampered after he was forced to undergo treatment for malaria, but he went on to produce similar numbers in the league, adding two goals in nine games in the team's semi-final run in the UEFA Cup, including the match's only in a home tie against Rangers.

Mallorca
Webó moved to RCD Mallorca in 2007, spending most of his first season on the sidelines with an injury. He did manage five league goals.

After Dani Güiza's departure, Webó's importance increased, and he totalled 18 goals the following three seasons, netting six in 2009–10 as the Balearic Islands team finished fifth and qualified to the Europa League (later revoked).

In the 2011 off-season, after scoring 11 goals in the campaign, with Mallorca narrowly avoiding relegation, Webó signed a three-year contract extension. In August, however, he asked to be relieved from his obligations for personal reasons, and joined İstanbul Başakşehir F.K. in Turkey.

Turkey
On 11 September 2011, in the first round of the season, Webó scored on his official debut for his new club, a 2–0 home defeat of Galatasaray SK. On 31 January 2013, he signed a two-and-a-half-year deal with fellow Süper Lig side Fenerbahçe SK for €3 million. Again he found the net in the first competitive match with his new team, but in a 1–2 home loss to Sivasspor.

On 7 March 2013, Webó scored the game's only goal in a win at FC Viktoria Plzeň in that season's Europa League round of 16 (2–1 on aggregate). He added another the following round, through a penalty for the first in a 2–0 home victory over S.S. Lazio.

Webó played in his first derby match against Galatasaray on 12 May 2013, scoring twice to secure a 2–1 win. The game was marred by racist chants from Fenerbahçe fans, directed to opposing players Didier Drogba and Emmanuel Eboué.

From 2015 to 2018, Webó continued to compete in the country, with Osmanlıspor and Gazişehir Gaziantep FK (the latter club in the TFF First League).

Return to Nacional
In September 2018, the 36-year-old Webó returned to Nacional de Montevideo after 16 years. After only 59 minutes of play across two league appearances, he left before the start of the 2019 season.

International
An international since 2003, Webó's first highlight playing for the Cameroon national team was a hat-trick in his country's 3–2 win in Ivory Coast in the 2006 FIFA World Cup qualifiers, but his team would not travel to Germany, precisely at the hands of that opponent. 

Webó scored in a 1–3 friendly loss against Portugal on 1 June 2010, and started in the first two games at that year's FIFA World Cup in South Africa (both ending in defeat), with the player not managing to find the net.

Webó was called up for the Africa Cup of Nations in 2006 and 2010, as well as the 2014 FIFA World Cup, but did not score in any tournament; however, at the latter continental tournament he set up both goals as a substitute in a draw with Tunisia that saw his team into the quarter-finals. On 17 November 2013, he was among the scorers in a 4–1 playoff victory over the same opponents that took Cameroon to the World Cup in Brazil.

Coaching career
After retiring, Webó joined İstanbul Başakşehir's coaching staff under Okan Buruk. In a Champions League group stage fixture against Paris Saint-Germain F.C. on 8 December 2020, he accused he was the target of racism by Romanian fourth official Sebastian Colțescu. The latter had allegedly used a term (negru, meaning black in Romanian), similar to a taboo racial slur in some western European countries but without the racial connotations, when describing and pointing out Webó to the main referee of the match, Ovidiu Hațegan; the incident, which occurred in the first half, ultimately led to the match being postponed, while UEFA also opened an investigation on the matter.

Personal life
Webó's cousin Geremi was a long-time international teammate for Cameroon.

Honours
Nacional
Uruguayan Primera División: 2001, 2002

Osasuna
Copa del Rey runner-up: 2004–05

Fenerbahçe
Süper Lig: 2013–14 
Turkish Cup: 2012–13
Turkish Super Cup: 2014
Individual
Copa Sudamericana Top Scorer: 2002

References

External links

1982 births
Living people
People from Bafoussam
Cameroonian footballers
Association football forwards
Real de Banjul FC players
Uruguayan Primera División players
Club Nacional de Football players
La Liga players
Segunda División players
CD Leganés players
CA Osasuna players
RCD Mallorca players
Süper Lig players
TFF First League players
İstanbul Başakşehir F.K. players
Fenerbahçe S.K. footballers
Ankaraspor footballers
Gaziantep F.K. footballers
Cameroon international footballers
2006 Africa Cup of Nations players
2010 Africa Cup of Nations players
2010 FIFA World Cup players
2014 FIFA World Cup players
Cameroonian expatriate footballers
Expatriate footballers in the Gambia
Expatriate footballers in Uruguay
Expatriate footballers in Spain
Expatriate footballers in Turkey
Cameroonian expatriate sportspeople in the Gambia
Cameroonian expatriate sportspeople in Uruguay
Cameroonian expatriate sportspeople in Spain
Cameroonian expatriate sportspeople in Turkey
İstanbul Başakşehir F.K. non-playing staff